Peduto is a surname. Notable people with the surname include:

Bill Peduto (born 1964), American politician
Ralph Peduto (1942–2014), American actor, playwright, writer and director